Ward Boston, Jr. (June 21, 1923 – June 12, 2008, in Coronado, California) was an attorney and a retired United States Navy Captain. He served in World War II as a Navy fighter pilot and worked as a special agent for the FBI. 

He gained notability due to his service in the Navy as a Legal Specialist, where, as chief counsel to the Naval Board of Inquiry investigating the 1967 Israeli attack on the USS Liberty that killed 34 crewmen and injured 172, he personally concluded that the attack was most likely deliberate. He stated the court was ordered by superiors to ascribe the attack to an accident, rather than to deliberate hostility, and that the original findings he signed were later modified by government attorneys.

Early life and career

As senior legal counsel for the Navy's Court of Inquiry, in 1967, Boston, together with Commander-in-Chief Naval Forces Europe and the Rear Admiral Isaac C. Kidd Jr., were given one week by Admiral John S. McCain Jr. to investigate the USS Liberty incident; They produced a three-inch thick report after gathering evidence from survivors who were still on board. The Court decided that there was insufficient evidence to make a decision regarding why Israel attacked the ship, but stopped short of assigning guilt or ruling that it was an accident.

Affidavit on the USS Liberty incident

In 2002 Boston told the Navy Times that the naval court was a politicized sham with conclusions preordained to exonerate Israel. In a 2004 signed affidavit, Boston stated that U.S. President Lyndon B. Johnson and U.S. Secretary of Defense Robert McNamara had ordered the President of the Court, Admiral Isaac C. Kidd, Jr., that the assault be ruled an accident, and to reach the conclusion "that the attack was a case of 'mistaken identity' despite 'overwhelming evidence to the contrary.'" He said he felt compelled to make this information public following the 2002 publication of the book The Liberty Incident by bankruptcy judge A. Jay Cristol, which concluded the attack was unintentional, while Boston found that the attack was most likely deliberate.
 In early 2004, Boston repeated the revelation before a State Department conference about the Six-Day War.

In 2007, Cristol suggested that another individual helped Boston with his initial affidavit and declaration, and very likely wrote or assisted in the preparation of a June 8, 2007, article; he claimed this was part of a much broader propaganda effort emanating from "a small but well-funded and very vocal group of people and organizations principally supported by Saudi Arabian money".

Death
Boston, a Coronado, California resident, died June 12, 2008, of complications from pneumonia at a San Diego hospital. He was 84.

References

1923 births
2008 deaths
United States Navy officers
USS Liberty incident
United States Navy personnel of World War II